Sir Thomas Clarges, 3rd Baronet (1751–1782) was an English politician who sat in the House of Commons from 1780 to 1782.

Clarges was the son  of Thomas Clarges of Aston, Hertfordshire and his wife Anne Shute of John Shute, 1st Viscount Barrington and was born on 4 October 1751. He succeeded his grandfather Sir Thomas Clarges, 2nd Baronet in the baronetcy on 19 February 1759. He was educated Eton College in 1765 and matriculated at Christ Church, Oxford in 1770.  He married Louisa Skrine, daughter of William Skrine on 20 October 1777.
   
Clarges was elected Member of Parliament  for Lincoln at the 1780 general election and held the seat until his death on 23 December 1782.

References

1751 births
1782 deaths
People educated at Eton College
Alumni of Christ Church, Oxford
People from East Hertfordshire District
Baronets in the Baronetage of England
Members of the Parliament of Great Britain for English constituencies
British MPs 1780–1784